Senator Ninoy Aquino, officially the Municipality of Senator Ninoy Aquino (Jawi: ايڠايد نو سناتور نينوي اكينو), is a 3rd class municipality in the province of Sultan Kudarat, Philippines. According to the 2020 census, it has a population of 47,374 people.

History
The municipality was created by virtue of Republic Act No. 6712 on February 17, 1989, and is named after Senator Benigno "Ninoy" Aquino Jr.

It brought Barangays Buenaflores, Bugso, Kiadsam, Kadi, Kulaman, Malegdeg and Sewod in the Municipality of Kalamansig and Langgal in the Municipality of Bagumbayan to constitute into an independent municipality. The seat of government of the municipality is situated in Barangay Kulaman.

Geography

Barangays
Senator Ninoy Aquino is politically subdivided into 20 barangays.

 Banali
 Basag
 Buenaflores
 Bugso
 Buklod
 Gapok
 Kadi
 Kapatagan
 Kiadsam
 Kuden
 Kulaman
 Lagubang
 Langgal
 Limuhay
 Malegdeg
 Midtungok
 Nati
 Sewod
 Tacupis
 Tinalon

Climate

Demographics

Economy

References

External links
Senator Ninoy Aquino Profile at PhilAtlas.com
Senator Ninoy Aquino Profile at the DTI Cities and Municipalities Competitive Index
[ Philippine Standard Geographic Code]
Philippine Census Information
Local Governance Performance Management System

Municipalities of Sultan Kudarat